Martin Luther King High School may refer to:

Martin Luther King High School (Davis, California)
Martin Luther King High School (Riverside, California)
Martin Luther King Jr. High School (Georgia) - DeKalb County, Georgia, Lithonia postal address
Martin Luther King High School (Detroit), Michigan
Martin Luther King High School (New York), New York
Martin Luther King High School (Philadelphia), Philadelphia, Pennsylvania
Martin Luther King Magnet at Pearl High School, Nashville, Tennessee
Martin Luther King Jr. Academy, Gary, Indiana
Martin Luther King High School (Chicago), Illinois
Martin Luther King, Jr. High School (New York), Hastings-on-Hudson, New York
Martin Luther King Jr. High School (Cleveland)
Luther King's College (Ileogbo) Osun State, Nigeria...founded in 1975

See also
 Martin Luther King (disambiguation)
 Lycée Martin Luther King (disambiguation) for senior high schools/sixth-form colleges in France named after King
 Martin Luther King Middle School (disambiguation)